Come Out of Your Mine is an album by Mia Doi Todd, released in 1999 by City Zen Records.

Track listing
 "Independence Day" - 4:41
 "Strawberries" - 3:13
 "Jackals" - 5:51
 "Save Me" - 2:07
 "Hijikata Tatsumi" - 3:02
 "Your Room" - 2:52
 "Sunday Afternoon" - 3:42
 "I've Got A Gun" - 2:56
 "Spring" - 2:56
 "Strange Wind" - 2:52
 "Age" - 1:25
 "The River & The Ocean" - 6:42

1999 albums
Mia Doi Todd albums